Refugees in Poland were, until 2022, a relatively small group. Since 1989, the number of people applying for refugee status in Poland has risen from about 1,000 to 10,000 each year; about 1–2% of the applications were approved. The majority of applications were citizens of the former Soviet Union (in particular, Chechnya and Ukraine).

Following the Russian invasion of Ukraine on 24 February 2022, more than 7.2 million refugees fleeing Ukraine have been recorded across Europe, with the vast majority initially fleeing to the countries closest to its western border. According to the United Nations High Commissioner for Refugees (UNHCR), almost 1.4 million people fled to neighboring Poland.

History
Following World War II, Poland became a communist country, and was a major refugee destination. The communist government allowed refugees only from countries affected by "class struggle" (such as Greece, Chile or Vietnam). It is estimated that the total number of refugees and asylum seekers who came to Poland in the period 1945–1989 was around 20,000–30,000 individuals. Following the fall of communism in 1989, Poland became a more appealing destination following its liberalization and a transition towards capitalistic and democratic society. UNHCR opened an office in Poland in 1992, following Poland's accession to the 1951 Refugee Convention and the 1967 Protocol. Among others, Poland became one of the destinations of refugees from former Soviet Union (in particular, Chechnya), Yugoslavia and Afghanistan. The number of refugees coming to Poland was still tiny compared to that coming to Western European countries; around 1,500 each year in the early 1990s. That number roughly doubled by late 1990s, and Polish government passed new laws as part of preparation for Poland's accession to the European Union. By early 2000s the number of people applying for refugee and asylum in Poland rose to 7,000. From 2010 the number has been oscillating at around 6–7,000 to 15,000: 10,000 in 2010 and 2012, 15,000 in 2013, 6,500 in 2014 and 12,000 in 2015.

Only about 1–2% of the applications were approved. In 2012, refugee status was granted to 106, while 477 received complementary protection. In 2013, 208 people received the refugee status, and 550 or complementary protection or "tolerated stay" category. About 85% of the individuals who apply for refugee status or asylum leave Poland, traveling to Western Europe, before the Polish agency makes a ruling, leading to their request being cancelled.

2021–2022 Belarus–European Union border crisis

The 2021–2022 Belarus–European Union border crisis began sometime around 7 July 2021 when Belarusian president Alexander Lukashenko threatened to "flood" the EU with human traffickers, drug smugglers, and armed migrants. Later, Belarusian authorities and state-controlled tourist enterprises, together with some airlines operating in the Middle East, started promoting tours to Belarus by increasing the number of connections from the Middle East and giving those who bought them Belarusian visas, ostensibly for hunting purposes. Social media groups were additionally offering fraudulent advice on the rules of crossing the border to the prospective migrants, most of whom were trying to reach Germany. Those who arrived in Belarus were then given instructions about how and where to trespass the European Union (EU) border, and what to tell the border guards on the other side of the border. Migrants said that Belarus provided them with wire cutters and axes to cut through border fences and enter the EU; however, those who did not manage to cross the border were often forced to stay there by Belarusian authorities, who were accused of assaulting some migrants who failed to get across. Belarusian authorities later confirmed that the involvement of the border troops is "absolutely possible". Belarus refused to allow Polish humanitarian aid for the migrants, which would have included tents and sleeping bags.

Poland, Lithuania, and Latvia have described the crisis as hybrid warfare, calling the crisis an incident of human trafficking of migrants, waged by Belarus against the EU. The three governments declared a state of emergency and announced their decisions to build border walls on their borders with Belarus, with Poland approving an estimated €353 million in spending to build a  barrier. The EU sent additional supporting officers and patrol cars to Lithuania, and 12 EU governments stated their support for a physical barrier along the border.

2022 Ukrainian refugee crisis

The 2022 Russian invasion of Ukraine that started on 24 February led to the 2022 Ukrainian refugee crisis. By 6 September 2022, according to the UNHCR, almost 7.2 million Ukrainian refugees left the territory of Ukraine, with the vast majority initially fleeing to the countries closest to its western border. Almost 1.4 million people fled to neighboring Poland.

Demographics

The largest refugee group in Poland are people from the former Soviet Union; prior to the 2022 Russian invasion of Ukraine each year since 2000 this group formed between 40–90% of the individuals applying for refugee status in Poland; out of those, the largest group were Chechens, who started applying for it at the start of the 21st century, following the Chechen Civil War. It is estimated there may be about 20,000 Chechens in Poland as of mid-2010s. The second largest group were the Ukrainians, who started applying for that status following the Ukrainian-Russian conflict; approximately 1 thousand to 2 thousand or more Ukrainians have been applying for the stay in Poland since the onset of that conflict. Third largest group from that region applying for stay in Poland are people from Georgia.

Since the start of the Syrian Civil War, between a hundred and three hundred Syrians have been applying for refugee status in Poland each year.

Attitude towards refugees
Over the past few decades, many Poles emigrated abroad seeking better jobs. This has been cited as one of the reasons Poles in 2000s have held some of the most pro-immigration, pro-refugee and pro-asylum-seekers views in Europe. This attitude started to change around 2015, following the onset of the European migrant crisis. Polish governments have not been supportive of the EU plans to distribute refugees throughout Europe, including Poland. Attitudes towards refugees have worsened. A nationwide poll from December 2016 showed that 52% do not wish for any refugees to arrive in Poland, 40% approve only of temporary resettlement, and only 4% approve of  permanent resettlement. More Polish people were favorable of refugees from Ukraine than from Middle East.

Opinion polls conducted between February 28 and March 10, 2022, during a period of significant influx of refugees immediately after the start of the 2022 Russian invasion of Ukraine, showed that the Polish society overwhelmingly supported helping Ukrainian refugees who were fleeing from war. Later polls taken at the turn of March and April also confirmed this sentiment.

See also

References

Further reading

  Integracja uchodźców w Polsce w liczbach, Polskie Forum Migracyjne, 2007

External links
 Office for Foreigners, Polish governmental agency dealing with foreigners in Poland
 Refugee.pl, English-language portal for refugees in Poland

 
Immigration to Poland
Society of Poland
European migrant crisis